The championships were once again dominated by Chinese players, with all four semifinalists from that country and two more Chinese players knocked out by their countrywomen.

Seeds

  Zhang Yining (champion)
  Guo Yue (final)
  Li Xiaoxia (semifinals)
  Guo Yan (fourth round)
  Feng Tianwei (quarterfinals)
  Kim Kyung-ah (third round)
  Wang Yuegu (second round)
  Tie Ya Na (second round)
  Jiang Huajun (fourth round)
  Liu Shiwen (semifinals)
  Liu Jia (third round)
  Ding Ning (fourth round)
  Gao Jun (second round)
  Li Jiao (fourth round)
  Sayaka Hirano (second round)
  Park Mi-young (fourth round)
  Li Qian (second round)
  Yao Yan (first round)
  Viktoria Pavlovich (third round)
  Dang Ye-seo (quarterfinals)
  Li Jie (third round)
  Krisztina Tóth (fourth round)
  Wu Jiaduo (third round)
  Lin Ling (third round)
  Sun Beibei (third round)
  Ai Fukuhara (second round)
  Daniela Dodean (third round)
  Yu Mengyu (fourth round)
  Tamara Boroš (first round)
  Elizabeta Samara (second round)
  Haruna Fukuoka (third round)
  Lau Sui Fei (first round)

Final Rounds

Early Rounds

Section 1

Section 2

Section 3

Section 4

Section 5

Section 6

Section 7

Section 8

- Women's singles, 2009 World Table Tennis Championships
World